"Vibez" is a song by English singer-songwriter Zayn Malik. It was released on 8 January 2021 through RCA Records as the second single from his third studio album, Nobody Is Listening. Malik wrote the song with its producers, Rogét Chahayed and Scribz Riley, alongside Nija Charles and Darnell Donohue. The song marks his first release of the year and it was released only one week exactly before the album was released.

Release and promotion
On 7 January 2021, Zayn teased "Vibez" on Twitter with a small video of an animated stage, with the word "TOMORROW" written on it.

Music video
The official music video for "Vibez" premiered on 8 January 2021, only twelve hours after the song was released, and directed by Ben Mor.

Composition
Musically, "Vibez" is a R&B song. The song is set in  common time and has a tempo of 97 beats per minute. It is written in the key of G major, and Zayn's vocals span from F3 to A4.

Charts

References

 

2021 singles
2021 songs
Songs written by Nija Charles
Songs written by Rogét Chahayed
Songs written by Zayn Malik
Zayn Malik songs
RCA Records singles